Ervin Katnić (2 September 1921 – 4 January 1979) was a Yugoslav football midfielder who was a member of the Yugoslavia national team at the 1950 FIFA World Cup. However, he never earned a cap for his country. He also played for Hajduk Split.

References

External links
FIFA profile

1921 births
1979 deaths
Yugoslav footballers
HNK Hajduk Split players
Yugoslav First League players
Association football midfielders
1950 FIFA World Cup players
Burials at Lovrinac Cemetery